Carmona is a district of the Nandayure canton, in the Guanacaste province of Costa Rica.

Geography 
Carmona has an area of  km² and an elevation of  metres.

Villages
Administrative center of the district is the village of Carmona.

Other villages in the district are Camas, Limones, Maquenco, San Rafael and Vista de Mar.

Demographics 

For the 2011 census, Carmona had a population of  inhabitants.

Transportation

Road transportation 
The district is covered by the following road routes:
 National Route 161
 National Route 902
 National Route 903

References 

Districts of Guanacaste Province
Populated places in Guanacaste Province